The St. Catharines Standard is a daily newspaper of the city of St. Catharines, Ontario, Canada.  the publication was owned by Torstar but on May 26, 2020, the company agreed to be acquired by NordStar Capital, a private investment firm. The deal was expected to close prior to year end.

History

The St. Catharines Standard was started in 1891, by W. B. Burgoyne.  The Standard, located in St. Catharines, Ontario, is the largest daily newspaper in Niagara. It has published continuously since 1891.

Its focus is local news, and it includes national and international news, sports, entertainment and lifestyle reporting. The newspaper is a consistent winner of Ontario Newspaper Awards, along with other newspaper industry awards.

It was later purchased by Southam Newspapers and then Canwest Global Communications. Osprey Media took over as publisher for a number of years until June 1, 2007, when it was announced Quebecor would acquire the company and its newspapers for $355.5 million. In 2015, Quebecor's English language newspapers were sold to Postmedia.

The Standard was one of several Postmedia newspapers purchased by Torstar in a transaction between the two companies which concluded on November 27, 2017. The paper continued to be published by the Metroland Media Group subsidiary of Torstar.

See also
List of newspapers in Canada

References

External links
 

Mass media in St. Catharines
Torstar publications
Daily newspapers published in Ontario
Publications established in 1891
1891 establishments in Ontario